Fred Makimare (born 17 June 1989) is an Australian rugby league player who has represented the Cook Islands. He played in Melbourne Storms Under 20s grand final win over the Wests Tigers.

Representative career
Fred Makimare was born in Australia, he has Cook Islanders ancestors.

Representative career
Fred Makimare made his international debut for the Cook Islands 22-20 defeat of Samoa, scoring 2 tries.

References

External links
 https://web.archive.org/web/20120224040611/http://www.melbournestorm.com.au/default.aspx?s=player-profile-nyc-display&id=356&team=Storm-nyc&fred-makimare
 https://archive.today/20120224040611/http://www.melbournestorm.com.au/default.aspx?s=player-profile-nyc-display&id=356&team=Storm-nyc&fred-makimare

1989 births
Australian people of Cook Island descent
Cook Islands national rugby league team players
Living people
Rugby league props